The 28th Critics' Choice Awards were presented on January 15, 2023, at the Fairmont Century Plaza Hotel in Los Angeles, California, honoring the finest achievements of filmmaking and television programming in 2022. The ceremony was broadcast on The CW and hosted by Chelsea Handler, taking over the reins from Taye Diggs who had hosted the show consecutively in the previous four years.

Like in the previous two years, film and television nominations were announced separately. The television nominations were announced on December 6, 2022. The film nominations were announced on December 14, 2022.

Everything Everywhere All at Once led the film nominations with 14—a record shared with The Shape of Water (2017), The Favourite (2018), and The Irishman (2019)—followed by The Fabelmans with 11. ABC's first-year mockumentary sitcom Abbott Elementary led the television nominations with six, followed by Better Call Sauls sixth and final season with five. Overall, Netflix received a total of 28 nominations, 13 for film and 15 for television, the most for any studio or network for the sixth year in a row.

Winners and nominees

Film

#SeeHer Award
 Janelle Monáe

Lifetime Achievement Award
 Jeff Bridges

Television

Films with multiple nominations and wins
The following nineteen films received multiple nominations:

The following five films received multiple awards:

Television programs with multiple nominations and wins
The following thirty programs received multiple nominations:

The following four programs received multiple awards:

Presenters

See also
 2nd Critics' Choice Super Awards
 3rd Critics' Choice Super Awards
 7th Critics' Choice Documentary Awards

References

External links
 The Winners of the 28th Annual Critics Choice Awards at Critics Choice Association

Broadcast Film Critics Association Awards
2022 film awards
2023 in Los Angeles
2022 television awards
2023 awards in the United States
January 2023 events in the United States